Lena Lake may refer to:

 Lena Lake (Glacier County, Montana), in Glacier National Park (U.S.)
 Lena Lake (Missoula County, Montana)
 Lena Lake (Powell County, Montana)